Steamed eggs may refer to:
 Poached egg
 Chinese steamed eggs, a Chinese dish
 Gyeran-jjim, a Korean dish
 Chawanmushi, a Japanese dish